Santic–Wibatech is a German UCI Continental team founded in 2012. It participates in UCI Continental Circuits races. The team was formerly registered in Poland.

Team roster

Major wins
2013
Stage 4 Carpathian Couriers Race U23, Paweł Franczak
2015
Stage 4 Szlakiem Grodòw Piastowskich, Sylwester Janiszewski
2016
Visegrad 4 Bicycle Race, Marek Rutkiewicz
Stage 1 Tour of Małopolska, Dariusz Batek
2018
Visegrad 4 Bicycle Race–GP Slovakia, Maciej Paterski
Visegrad 4 Bicycle Race–GP Poland, Maciej Paterski
Overall Tour of Estonia, Grzegorz Stępniak
Stage 1 Tour of Małopolska, Maciej Paterski
Overall Course Cycliste de Solidarnosc et des Champions Olympiques, Sylwester Janiszewski
1st Stages 1 & 5, Sylwester Janiszewski
Puchar Uzdrowisk Karpackich, Maciej Paterski
Minsk Cup, Maciej Paterski
Grand Prix Judendorf-Straßengel, Maciej Paterski
2019
Stage 3 Circuit des Ardennes International, Maciej Paterski
Prologue Carpathian Couriers Race, Marceli Bogusławski
Stages 2 & 3 CCC Tour – Grody Piastowskie, Maciej Paterski
Overall Wyscig Mjr. Hubala – Sante Tour, Maciej Paterski
Stage 1 & 2b, Grzegorz Stępniak
Stage 3, Maciej Paterski
Stage 1 Tour of Małopolska, Anatoliy Budyak
2020
Prologue Tour Bitwa Warszawska 1920, Marceli Bogusławski

National Champions
2018
 Poland Hill Climb, Maciej Paterski

References

External links

UCI Continental Teams (Europe)
Cycling teams based in Germany
Cycling teams established in 2012